Basanta Kumar Das (1898 – 1 December 1984) was an Indian Politician belonging to the Indian National Congress. He was elected to the Lok Sabha, the Lower house of Indian Parliament from Contai constituency, West Bengal in 1952 and 1962. He was earlier a member of the Constituent Assembly of India representing West Bengal.

References

External links
Official biographical sketch in Parliament of India website

1898 births
Year of death missing
India MPs 1952–1957
India MPs 1962–1967
Members of the Constituent Assembly of India
Indian National Congress politicians from West Bengal
Lok Sabha members from West Bengal
Place of birth missing
People from Purba Medinipur district